Speaking in Tongues is an Australian television program broadcast on SBS Television. The first episode was broadcast on 7 November 2005. The series ran for twelve episodes, with the final episode airing on 23 January 2006.

The program is hosted by John Safran and Father Bob Maguire, who discuss current events from a religious perspective, often in a comedic manner. Maguire, a Catholic priest from South Melbourne, originally appeared on the early show John Safran vs God.

Speaking in Tongues was the first Australian television program to be released as a free podcast. The episodes were released for download on the morning following each week's broadcast .

The series was directed by John Safran vs God director Craig Melville.

External links 
 The official Speaking in Tongues website
 Director's site - Download or watch full episodes
 

Australian community access television shows
Special Broadcasting Service original programming
2005 Australian television series debuts
2006 Australian television series endings